Hukumina is an extinct Austronesian language recently spoken in the northwest of Buru Island in the Maluku Islands of eastern Indonesia.

References 

Central Maluku languages
Languages of the Maluku Islands
Extinct languages of Oceania